Karataika (Nenets: Харая, Haraja) is a village in Zapolyarny District, Nenets Autonomous Okrug. It had a population of 544 as of 2010, a decrease from its population of 625 in 2002.

References

Rural localities in Nenets Autonomous Okrug